Network For Education and Academic Rights (NEAR) is a membership-based, non-governmental organisation which works to promote and protect academic freedom and academic rights. 
NEAR facilitates international collaboration between organisations and individuals active in issues of academic freedom and education rights, and seeks to defend the human rights of those in the higher education sector, including academics, researchers and students. NEAR was launched at the UNESCO offices in Paris in June 2001.

NEAR receives reports of academic freedom violations from its members or credible media sources, and works to increase awareness and response through its emergency action alert system, bulletins and media outreach. NEAR also works with academics and activists worldwide active on issues of academic freedom and academic rights to encourage joint action and build capacity through its series of international workshops.  
NEAR members include Amnesty International, the AAAS- American Association for the Advancement of Sciences, the AAUP, Article 19, the ACU, CODESRIA, Education International, Index on Censorship, IAU, International PEN, Human Rights Watch, the National Academy of Sciences, UCU and the World University Service.

NEAR also maintains partnerships with other associations and organisations with related objectives, including Scholars at Risk, the African Academic Freedom Network and the Arab Society for Academic Freedom. 
NEAR is hosted by the Council for Assisting Refugee Academics in London. Professor John Akker is the executive director.

External links
Official Website (site down)
Archived versions of Official website, via Human Rights Web Archive
NEAR/SAR Academic Freedom Workshops

Academic freedom
Education rights
Freedom of expression organizations
Organizations established in 2001
Organisations based in London